Reģi Manor is a manor house in the village of Reģi in Alsunga Parish, Kuldīga Municipality in the Courland region of Latvia.

History 
 was first mentioned in writings around 1253. 
Later the manor belonged to the Štempeļi family. The current manor house was built in 1890, probably according to the design of Paul Max Bertschy. Until the agrarian reform in Latvia, manor was privately owned. After the manor became state-owned, a hospital was established there, and later - a social care center "Regi".
On 22 February 2007, a devastating fire broke out at the Regi social care center, killing 23 of the 90 residents. It became the most devastating fire in the history of Latvia.

Entrepreneur Valentīns Kokalis bought the burnt-down building at auction in 2011 in order to build a hotel. After the fire, the Latvian Association of Castles and Manors called for the building to be preserved and restored.

See also
Wolmar Anton von Schlippenbach
List of palaces and manor houses in Latvia

References

External links
  Reģi Manor

Manor houses in Latvia
Kuldīga Municipality
Aizpute County
Courland